Shrikant Deshpande is an Indian politician belonging to the Shiv Sena party. He was member of the Maharashtra Legislative Council from Amravati Teacher constituency.

Positions held
 2014: Elected to Maharashtra Legislative Council

References

External links
Shivsena Home Page 

Living people
Year of birth missing (living people)
Shiv Sena politicians
Members of the Maharashtra Legislative Council